Kroenig and Kroening are surnames. Notable people include:

 Brad Kroenig, American model
Carl W. Kroening (1928-2017), American educator and politician
Daniel Kroening, German computer scientist
 Matthew Kroenig, American professor and foreign policy advisor